Bonel P. Balingit (born November 30, 1967), also known as The Gentle Giant and Man-Mountain, is a Filipino retired professional basketball player who played as a center.

Basketball career
The hulking Bonel played for the University of the Visayas and then joined Magnolia Ice Cream in the PBL.  He turn pro in 1992 and was drafted in the second round and 11th overall by the Swift Mighty Meaty Hotdogs in the 1992 PBA draft. Easily one of the most popular cager on the Swift roster who can draw cheers from the fans, Balingit spent all of his first seven PBA seasons with the RFM franchise and was handled by coaches Yeng Guiao, Derrick Pumaren and Norman Black. He was part of the ballclub's four championships from 1992 to 1995 and won Most Improved Player honors in the 1995 PBA season.

Balingit moved to the Metropolitan Basketball Association beginning the 1999 season and played for the San Juan Knights. He returned to the PBA in 2001, playing for Tanduay Rhum Masters and have suited up for Purefoods TJ Hotdogs in his final playing career.

Acting career
During his playing years, Balingit also dabbled into acting, appearing in TV sitcoms and comedy films.

References

External links
PBA league profile

1967 births
Living people
Basketball players from Lanao del Norte
Centers (basketball)
UV Green Lancers basketball players
Filipino men's basketball players
Magnolia Hotshots players
Philippine Basketball Association All-Stars
Pop Cola Panthers players
San Juan Knights players
Pop Cola Panthers draft picks